Yevgeni Aleksandrovich Cherkes (born 23 June 2001) is a Russian football player who plays as a central midfielder for FC Neftekhimik Nizhnekamsk.

Club career
He made his debut in the Russian Premier League for FC Rostov on 27 June 2020 in a game against FC Arsenal Tula, replacing Baktiyar Zaynutdinov in the 88th minute.

Personal life
His father Aleksandr Cherkes is a football coach and former player.

References

External links
 
 
 

2001 births
Footballers from Voronezh
Living people
Russian footballers
Association football midfielders
FC Energomash Belgorod players
FC Salyut Belgorod players
FC Rostov players
FC Khimki players
FC Neftekhimik Nizhnekamsk players
Russian Premier League players
Russian First League players
Russian Second League players